West Carroll Parish Detention Center was a parish jail in West Carroll Parish, Louisiana

References

Parish jails in Louisiana